The term freedmen refers to descendants of people of African descent who were enslaved by members of the Five Civilized Tribes, including Cherokee, Choctaw, Chickasaw, Muscogee (Creek) and Seminole freedmen. They often overlap with those who are descended from those enslaved African descendants who voluntarily joined the Seminole nation, including those who fled from the Seminole Nation, when it adopted the practice of slavery, to Mexico, today known as Mascogos. 

Among the five tribes, only the Cherokee Nation (one of three Cherokee nations granted federal recognition by the United States government) and the Seminole Tribe of Florida (formally separate from the Seminole Nation of Oklahoma) formally recognize Freedmen as eligible for full citizenship upon proof of blood quantum.

See also 

 Native American slave ownership
 Black Indians in the United States
 Zambo
 Métis

References 

African-American society
African–Native American relations
Black Native Americans
Multiracial affairs in North America